International Ms. Leather (IMsL) is a leather subculture fetish convention for women, held annually in California. Since 1999, the convention has also included a Ms. Bootblack (IMsBB) contest.
 
After Ms. Leather events had been held in San Francisco since 1981, the first formal International Ms. Leather convention took place in 1987. The first International Ms. Leather was Judy Tallwing McCarthey.

In 1988, International Ms. Leather received the Large Club of the Year award as part of the Pantheon of Leather Awards. In 2009, 2013, and 2017, International Ms. Leather received the Large Event of the Year award as part of the Pantheon of Leather Awards, and in 2018 International Ms Leather Bootblack received that award.

International Ms. Leather moved in 2014 from the SOMA neighborhood of San Francisco to San Jose. The International Ms Leather (IMsL) Foundation began its work in 2015. The foundation’s website states, “We are committed to fostering healthy environments for Women to succeed in Leather and Kink spaces by providing education, programming, and financial support.” In 2016 that foundation received the Nonprofit Organization of the Year award as part of the Pantheon of Leather Awards.

International Ms. Leather has had a focus on community leadership from the start. The contestants must meet objectives and deadlines set before the convention, and at the event are judged on costuming, speech, a fantasy performance, knowledge of the leather scene as demonstrated in a quiz and an interview, and also organizing skills as demonstrated in having two others set up an auction table for them at the convention.

Producers of the event have included Audrey Joseph and 1993's International Ms. Leather winner Amy Marie Meek (later Amy Meek-DeJarlais). "Amy Marie Meek – International Ms. Leather" received the International Deaf Leather Recognition Award in 2001.

Judges have included Kitty Tsui.


International Ms. Leather Winners

International Ms. Bootblack Winners

See also 
 International Mr. Leather

References

External links 
 

Fetish subculture
Recurring events established in 1987
BDSM organizations
LGBT BDSM
LGBT beauty pageants
LGBT culture in Chicago
Leather events
Lesbian BDSM
1987 establishments in the United States
Annual events in the United States